Switzerland competed at the 1992 Winter Paralympics in Tignes/Albertville, France. 19 competitors from Switzerland won 15 medals including 3 gold, 8 silver and 4 bronze and finished 8th in the medal table.

See also 
 Switzerland at the Paralympics
 Switzerland at the 1992 Winter Olympics

References 

1992
1992 in Swiss sport
Nations at the 1992 Winter Paralympics